Ice sledge hockey at the 1994 Winter Paralympics consisted of a mixed event.

Although it was a mixed event, the only female athlete was the Norwegian Britt Mjaasund Øyen.

Medal summary

Preliminary round

Bronze medal game

Gold medal game

References

External links 
 Lillehammer 1994 – Para Ice Hockey – Mixed Tournament

1994 Winter Paralympics events
1994
Paralympics